Singapore Sports School (SSP) is a specialised independent boarding school under the purview of Ministry of Culture, Community and Youth of the Government of Singapore that offers an integrated sports and academic programme to secondary and post-secondary students in Singapore.

Management 
Moo Soon Chong was the first principal of Singapore Sports School. He was assisted by Chua Choon Seng, Director of Corporate Services and Irwin Seet, Director of Sports, Seah Poh Chua, Director of Academics and School Administration, who was Dean of the Academic Wing then, and a core team.

Moo Soon Chong retired on 14 December 2007 and Deborah Tan was appointed as the new principal of Singapore Sports School on the following day. Deborah Tan was appointed to a senior position at the Ministry of Education and left the school on 14 December 2013.

Followed by Deborah Tan's departure, Tan Teck Hock is appointed as the new principal of Singapore Sports School. Tan Teck Hock had served in the Education Service since 1992. He was the principal of Yishun Town Secondary School from December 1999 to December 2005 and Serangoon Junior College from December 2006 to December 2010. Tan Teck Hock was the founding Principal of the Physical Education and Sports Teacher Academy in 2010.

On 15 December 2019, Singapore Sports School announced that Ong Kim Soon would replace Tan Teck Hock. Ong Kim Soon was a PE and English teacher, head of department, vice-principal and special assistant of the principal at Saint Hilda's Secondary School, and Director of Physical, Sports, and Outdoor Education in the Ministry of Education Headquarters.

Sport Programmes and Achievements 
Student-athletes in Singapore Sports School are either in an Academy Programme or in an Individual Programme.

The Academy Programmes are in the following sports:

 Badminton
 Bowling
 Fencing
 Football
 Netball 
 Sailing
 Shooting 
 Swimming 
 Table Tennis 
 Track and Field

Singapore Sports School also welcomes high-performing youth athletes to join the Individual Programme sports such as Artistic Swimming, Golf, Gymnastics, Pencak Silat, Sailing and Wushu.

Athlete-Friendly Academic Pathways 
The Sports School offers the GCE "O" Level Examinations and several post-secondary through-train pathways. Student-athletes on the through-train pathways bypass the GCE "O" Level Examinations and progress onto one of three pathways conducted at Sports School: the International Baccalaureate Diploma Programme (IBDP), the customised Diploma in Sport Management (RP-SSP DSPM) from Republic Polytechnic or the customised Diploma in Business Studies (Entrepreneurship Management Option) (BS-EMGT) from Ngee Ann Polytechnic.

Singapore 2010 Youth Olympic Games
Singapore Sports School was the venue for the modern pentathlon, shooting and swimming events of the 2010 Summer Youth Olympics held in Singapore.

National Youth Sports Institute 
The National Youth Sports Institute (NYSI) is a youth-centric and youth-focused sporting organisation that aims to value-add and positively impact the Singapore youth sports ecosystem. Initiated by the Ministry of Culture, Community and Youth.NYSI works closely with the Singapore Sports School and Singapore Sports Institute to drive youth sports development through four functional areas: Talent Identification and Development, Youth Coaching, Sports Science and Athlete Life Management.

Notable alumni

 Calvin Kang, Sprinter
 Dipna Lim Prasad, Hurdler
 Mylene Ong, Swimmer
 Tao Li, Swimmer
 Narelle Kheng, Actress and singer 
 Benjamin Kheng, Actor and singer
 Ben Davis, Footballer
 Terry Hee, Badminton player, 2022 India Open and 2022 Commonwealth Games Champion Mixed Doubles
 Loh Kean Yew, Badminton player and 2021 BWF World Champion

References

External links
Singapore Sports School - Official website

Educational institutions established in 2004
2004 establishments in Singapore
Independent schools in Singapore
Secondary schools in Singapore
Sport schools in Singapore
Woodlands, Singapore
Venues of the 2010 Summer Youth Olympics
Youth Olympic swimming venues